Lietava may refer to:

Slovakia 
 Lietava
 Lietava Castle

Lithuania 
 Lietava (Neris)
 FK Jonava